Alexandre Carrier (born October 10, 1996) is a Canadian professional ice hockey defenceman. He is currently playing for the  Nashville Predators of the National Hockey League (NHL). He was drafted by the Predators in the fourth round, 115th overall, in the 2015 NHL Entry Draft.

Early life
Carrier was born on October 10, 1996, in Quebec City, Quebec, to father  Bernard Carrier. He was born into a hockey family as his father played major junior hockey for the Quebec Remparts while his brother was drafted by the Washington Capitals.

Playing career
Carrier played amateur midget junior hockey in his native Quebec, with Collège Antoine-Girouard Gaulois of the QMAAA. He embarked on a major junior career, after he was selected 4th overall in the 2012 QMJHL Entry Draft, by the Gatineau Olympiques. As a mobile, two-way defenceman, and following a break out 55 point campaign in the 2014–15 season, Carrier was selected in the 2015 NHL Entry Draft by the Nashville Predators.

During his final junior season with the Olympiques, Carrier was signed to his first NHL contract, agreeing to a three-year entry-level deal with the Predators on November 12, 2015. Limited to 57 games with Gatineau in the 2015–16 season, Carrier matched his previous goal total with 12 and contributed with 47 points before suffering a second-round defeat in the post-season.

In his first professional season and after attending the Predators training camp, Carrier was assigned to begin the 2016–17 season in the AHL with affiliate, the Milwaukee Admirals. Carrier made a seamless transition to the AHL ranks, leading the Admirals defence in scoring and earning selection to the AHL All-Star Game before he received his first NHL recall on January 13, 2017. He made his NHL debut with the Predators in a 1–0 shutout defeat to the Vancouver Canucks on January 21, 2017. He was returned to the Admirals after two scoreless games with Nashville.

Career statistics

Regular season and playoffs

International

Awards and honours

References

External links
 

1996 births
Living people
Canadian ice hockey defencemen
Chicago Wolves players
French Quebecers
Gatineau Olympiques players
Ice hockey people from Quebec City
Milwaukee Admirals players
Nashville Predators draft picks
Nashville Predators players